Jude Iloba Ogada (born 15 December 1989, Abuja, Nigeria) is a Nigerian football defender who last played for Dinamo-Auto Tiraspol.

Club statistics
Total matches played in Moldavian First League: 141 matches - 8 goals

References

External links

Profile at FC Dacia Chișinău

1989 births
People from Abuja
Nigerian footballers
Living people
Association football defenders
CSF Bălți players
FC Tiraspol players
FC Dacia Chișinău players
FC Dinamo-Auto Tiraspol players
Moldovan Super Liga players
Nigerian expatriate footballers
Expatriate footballers in Moldova
Nigerian expatriate sportspeople in Moldova